Barolong is a tribe of Tswana people from Botswana and South Africa. Their King, Tau was the descendant of King Morolong who is the founder of Barolong tribe. He reigned around 1240 and adopted Tholo (the Kudu) as the Barolong totem. King Tau was a warrior king who reigned around 1660. He fought many battles and consolidated the Barolong tribe to become a very strong kingdom. He had many wives and begot many sons and daughters. The prominent four sons are Ratlou, Tshidi, Seleka and Rapulana. The Barolong tribe later used the names of the warrior King Tau's sons as their clan names. The Barolong tribe spread across the regions covering Botswana (erstwhile Bechuanaland), through to Transvaal, Northern Cape and Free State. Its important to note that King Tau’s heir to the throne was Ratlou. After the death of King Tau in Taung, to which Taung is named after, Barolong left Taung under Nthua, the younger brother of Tau. They settled in Dithakwaneng, and later, Dithakong, where Nthua died and was buried. Ratlou and the tribe left Dithakong for Mamusa, and later settled in their former capital I.e. Setlagole. This is the place where the kingship of Barolong disintegrated into a number of clans, after Tau's sons. This is after the death of Ratlou. He (Ratlou) had four sons i.e. Mariba, Seitshiro, Mokalake and Moirwagale. Two of these sons fought for the throne, with Mokalake supporting Mariba while Moirwagale supported Seitshiro. Moirwagale became the Regent for Seitshiro while Mokalake became one for Mariba. Finally Barolong disintegrated into four clans, and later five. Their final settlements are as follows; Ratlou; Mariba (Ganyesa); Seitshiro (Khunwana); Tshidi and Makgetla-Mahikeng; Seleka-Thaba nchu; Rapulana-Bodibe.

The fierce battle between Mariba and Seitshiro ended up splitting Ratlou further into two sub-clans. The clan under Mariba resolved to reside in Bothithong, later Morokweng and finally established their capital in Ganyesa. They reigned over vast area in Vryburg and surrounding areas through kgosikgolo (paramount chiefs) Mariba, Moamogwa, Kegakilwe, Nchelang, Letlhogile and Thibogang. The Seitshiro clan was ruled by Seitshiro, Moshewa, Matlakoe, Gontse, Moshwete ..., in that order.

The second son Tshidi resided in Mahikeng (the Barolong boo rra Tshidi) with their chiefs being Thutlwa, KING Tawana, Montshiwa, Kebalepile and W. Montshiwa ..., in that order. The other clan (Barolong ba ga Seleka) resided in Thaba Nchu and their chiefs were Seleka, Koikoi/Mpolokang, Modimogale-a-Mpolokang, Moroka (Regent), Sefunelo (Regent), Moroka (Regent had issue with Phutiagae) Samuel (with Issue vs Tshipinare), Molekana ..., in that order.

It is important to note that Moroka was not the son of Koikoi/Mpolokang but his younger brother and therefore actual Regent for a much younger, Modimogale-a-Mpolokang. This is noted by Dr Silas Molema ‘Chief Moroka, The Life and Times’.

It is important to note that Samuel Moroka was banished to British Bechuanaland after the death/murder of co-claimant to the throne Tshipinare (1884).

Samuel Moroka and his followers eventually settled in Matsiloje, British Bechuanaland, where currently his descendants are settled with their leader Moipolai.

The followers and descendants of Tshipinare remain in Thaba Nchu and reside with their leader a descendant of Tshipinare, Kgosi Moroka.

The other clan (Barolong ba ga Rapulana),  resided in Lotlhakane and Bodibe. Their chiefs were Rapulana, Molekana, Makhowe , Matlaba, Shuduntlhe, Ramolekane in that order.

The Barolong chiefs, Moroka (James Moroka) and Dr Silas Molema (Molema's are the uncles of the Barolong boo rra Tshidi), played a key role in formation of the liberation movement (African National Congress).

The first Morolong chief was Morolong, who lived many years ago around 1240, from whom the tribe derives its name and as he was laid to rest many of his sons never reconciled. Seleka is the first son of King Morolong.

Rulers of the Rolong tribe:
1240 Morolong
1270 Noto
1300 Morara
1330 Mabe
1360 mabudi
1390 Moloto
1420 Mabeo
1450 Modiboa
1480 Tshesebe
1510 Monnyane
1540 Setlhare
1570 Masepa
1600 Mokgopha
1630 Thibela
1660 King Tau
1690 Ratlou, Tshidi, Seleka, Rapulana
1720 Seitshiro, Thutlwa, Koikoi, Molekane 
1750 Moshewa, KING Tawana, Moroka, Makhowe
1780 Matlakoe, Montshioa Tawana, Sehunelo, Matlaba
1810 Gontsi, Kebalepile, Moroka, Shuduntlhe
1840 Moshwete, W. Montshioa, Samuele, Ramolekana
1870 Molekana
In Botswana the Rolong tribe is found in the Southern part of Botswana in Goodhope and villages surrounding it.

See also
List of rulers of Barolong

External links

Sotho-Tswana peoples in South Africa